Aytugan (Aytuğan) is a rural locality (a village) in Gayniyamaksky Selsoviet, Alsheyevsky District, Bashkortostan, Russia. The population was 16 as of 2010. There is 1 street.

Geography 
Aytugan is located 58 km southwest of Rayevsky (the district's administrative centre) by road. Malye Gayny is the nearest rural locality.

References 

Rural localities in Alsheyevsky District